is a boys' love manga created by Suzuki Tanaka. The story follows Takahiko Satō, a handsome student that all the girls in his school idolize and adore, but who in turn has no real interest in them. He is in love with "his most favorite", Yoshio Yoshida, a fellow student who protected Satō from bullies when he was younger. However, as Yoshida is so close to Satō, all the girls at the school hate him. His Most Favorite was one of the first titles released in print by SuBLime, the yaoi imprint of Viz Media, under the title of His Favorite. In August 2015 it was announced that His Favorite would be adapted as a live-action TV series.

Characters
Takahiko Satō is a handsome student who is idolized by all the girls at his school. However, he has no interest in them and considers fellow student Yoshio Yoshida "his most favorite." Four years previously, Satō was bullied by other students because he was overweight, but Yoshida protected him. Satō's parents then sent him to a school in England which turned out to be a fat camp which forced pupils to lose weight by, among other things, fighting wild animals. There he lost weight, shot up in height, and became the attractive figure he is now. He dotes on Yoshida, but he also has a sadistic streak and likes to play with Yoshida's fears. He eventually reveals his relationship with Yoshida to the school, but this seems to have no effect on the girls chasing after him.
Yoshio Yoshida is Satō's boyfriend. He's considered unattractive by their schoolmates because he's very short with an X-shaped scar on his face, which he got while protecting Satō in their younger days. All the girls who love Satō hate Yoshida for spending so much time so close to their idol. Yoshida often worries about concealing his romantic relationship with Satō and protests when Satō is too affectionate at school. He also tries to rein in some of Satō's sadistic tendencies toward others. He's easily scared of ghosts, the supernatural, and haunted houses. After his relationship with Satō is made public, he finds himself even more at odds with the girls who are after Satō.
Hosaku Akimoto is one of Yoshida's friends. Unlike most of the male students he appears to be in a relationship, as he's seen dating his neighbour Yoko, although he insists they are just friends.
Makimura is another of Yoshida's friends. Desperate to get a girlfriend, Makimura constantly fails, partly due to his appearance, having pimples on his face. He pursues a series of different girls, and particularly tries to win the affections of Machiko Arima.
Yamanaka was once considered the second most popular boy at school, after Satō. He saw Satō as his rival for the favor of the girls at school. He made a pass at Yoshida to try to get at Satō, prompting Satō to strike back by spreading rumors that Yamanaka was a pervert, causing his popularity to fall. He is now in a new relationship with Torachin.
Tsuyako Ijuin is a former member of the fat camp that Satō attended, the only other Japanese student there. Like Satō, she's also a sadist, though she remarks that Satō differs in his sadism because he's bored by people who obey him. Tsuyako is from a wealthy family and has odd ways of showing affection.
The Nozawa Twins are an older sister and younger brother who represent the school's art club. Both of them often want to draw Yoshida and Satō, pestering them until they agree.
Toranosuke "Torachin" Takahashi is a friend of Yoshida's since junior high school. His real name is Toranosuke, but he was nicknamed "Torachin" because there were two Toranosukes in their class. Similarly Torachin nicknamed Yoshida "Yoshi-Yoshi" because there were two Yoshidas in the class. He has difficulty attracting girls because he looks tough and intimidating, but later he seems to form a relationship with Yamanaka.
Murakami becomes the second most popular guy in school after Yamanaka falls from grace. He secretly enjoys cross-dressing and thinks he makes a better-looking girl than any of the others at school.
Seijuro Nishida is an openly gay student who's also in love with Yoshida. He appears to be Satō's opposite in character: Nishida is earnest, friendly, and helpful, even heroic. He and Satō battle over Yoshida, sometimes at school, which other students interpret as a comedy routine.
Machiko Arima is the president of the student council who is also in love with Satō. She uses her position to organize events so that she has a chance of winning, where being alone with Satō is the main prize. Makimura is in love with her.
Takeru Azuma is a male transfer student who used to be in a relationship with Nishida since the age of five. He is still in love with Nishida and thus considers Yoshida a rival for his affections. Satō thus tries to get Nishida to like Azuma again.

Media
His Favorite began serialization in 2008. The first tankōbon volume was released in Japan by Libre Publishing on July 18, 2008. So far ten volumes have been published. The series was released in English by SuBLime, with the first volume being released on September 11, 2012. In August 2015 a series of live-action commercials were made to commemorate the release of the ninth volume. Kōta Torii played Yoshida, and Takeaki Isowa played Sato.

Reception
Ian Wolf of MyM magazine praised His Most Favorite writing that: "One interesting aspect is that Yoshida is not conventionally attractive because of a scar on his face which would put some people off. However the humour is good and the chemistry between the two works well."

Shaenon K. Garrity, writing for Anime News Network, was mostly positive about the series. She praised the humour, the extended cast and the character development. Garrity however, also expressed annoyance for the lack of sex there was in His Most Favorite.

References

External links
 

2008 manga
Romance anime and manga
Yaoi anime and manga
Comedy anime and manga
SuBLime manga